Rohan Pandit (born 13 January 1981) is an Indian cricket umpire. He has stood in matches in the Ranji Trophy tournament.

References

External links
 

1981 births
Living people
Indian cricket umpires
Place of birth missing (living people)